is a passenger railway station located in the city of Mimasaka, Okayama Prefecture, Japan. It is operated by the third-sector semi-public railway operator Chizu Express. The station takes its name from the famous warrior Miyamoto Musashi, who (according to one theory) was born nearby.

Lines

Station layout
The station consists of a single side platform located on an embankment serving a single bi-directional track. The station is unattended.

Adjacent stations

History
Miyamoto Musashi Station opened on December 3, 1994 with the opening of the Chizu Line.

Passenger statistics
In fiscal 2018, the station was used by an average of 10 passengers daily.

Surrounding area
Miyamoto Musashi Budokan
Mimasaka City Ōhara Elementary School
Mimasaka City Ōhara Middle School
Miyamoto Musashi Archives
National Route 373
National Route 429
Okayama Prefectural Route 5
Okayama Prefectural Route / Hyōgo Prefectural Route 240

See also
List of railway stations in Japan

References

External links

 Official home page

Railway stations in Hyōgo Prefecture
Railway stations in Japan opened in 1994
Mimasaka, Okayama
Miyamoto Musashi